The James R. DeBow House, also known as Vinewood, is a historic house in Hartsville, Tennessee, U.S.. It was built from 1854 to 1870 for James R. DeBow, who inherited the land from his father (himself inheriting it from DeBow's grandfather, American Revolutionary War veteran Frederick DeBow). The 
house was designed in the Italianate architectural style. During the American Civil War of 1861–1862, the partially completed house was used as a hospital for the Union Army. By the late 1800s, it was purchased by merchant James R. Andrews, followed by Noel Coleman Winston in 1904. It has been listed on the National Register of Historic Places since November 3, 1988.

References

Houses on the National Register of Historic Places in Tennessee
Italianate architecture in Tennessee
Houses completed in 1870
1854 establishments in Tennessee
Buildings and structures in Trousdale County, Tennessee
Union Army